T. Davis Bunn (1952)  is an American author. He grew up in North Carolina and earned his BA from Wake Forest University in 1974, in psychology and economics, before moving to London to study for an M.Sc. in international finance and economics at the  Gresham College. He became a consultant and lecturer in international finance and worked in Switzerland and Germany. Bunn and his wife now live in Oxford, UK, where his wife is on faculty at Regent's Park College, Oxford University. He is Novelist in Residence at the same college. When not in Oxford, he lives in Florida.

Bunn is writer of historical fiction and legal thrillers, in which Christian faith plays a major part. He has written novels together with Canadian author Janette Oke, and others with his wife Isabella.  Bunn has recently begun publishing using the name Davis Bunn. Bunn has also used the pseudonym Thomas Locke. He won a Christy Award four times. His books are published by Bethany House and worldwide by several local publishers.

Bibliography

Novels series

T.J. Case Series
The Presence (1990)
Promises to Keep (1991)

Priceless Collection
Florian's Gate (1992)
The Amber Room (1992)
Winter Palace (1993)

Rendezvous With Destiny
Rhineland Inheritance (1993)
Gibraltar Passage (1994)
Sahara Crosswind (1992)
Berlin Encounter (1995)
Istanbul Express (1995)
In the Shadows of Victory (1998)--Books 1-3 bound in one volume
A Passage Through Darkness (2000)--Books 4-5 bound in one volume

Reluctant Prophet
The Warning (1998)
The Ultimatum (1999)

Song of Acadia (with Janette Oke)
The Meeting Place (1999)
The Sacred Shore (2000)
The Birthright (2001)
The Distant Beacon (2002)
The Beloved Land (2002)

Marcus Glenwood Series
The Great Divide (2000)
Drummer in the Dark (2001)
Winner Take All (2003)

Heirs of Acadia
The Solitary Envoy (2004), with Isabella Bunn
The Innocent Libertine (2004)
The Noble Fugitive (2005)
The Night Angel (2006), with Isabella Bunn
Falconer's Quest (2007), with Isabella Bunn

Premier Mystery Series
The Lazarus Trap (2005)
Imposter (2006)

Storm Syrrell Adventure Series
Gold of Kings (2009)
The Black Madonna (2010)

Acts of Faith series with Janette Oke
The Centurion's Wife  (2009)
The Hidden Flame (2010)
The Damascus Way (2011)

Marc Royce Adventures
Lion of Babylon (2011)
Rare earth (2012)
Strait of Hormuz (2013)

Miramar Bay Series
Miramar Bay (2017)
Firefly Cove (2018)
Moondust Lake (2018)
Unscripted (2019)

Other novels
 The Maestro (1991)
 The Quilt (1992)
 Dangerous Devices (1993)
 Riders of the Pale Horse (1994)
 The Gift (1994)
 Light and Shadow (1995)
 The Messenger (1995)
 The Music Box (1996)
 Return to Harmony (1996), with Janette Oke
 Another Homecoming (1997), with Janette Oke
 Deadly Games (1997)
 Tidings of Comfort and Joy (1997)
 One Shenandoah Winter (1998)
 Princess Bella and the Red Velvet Hat (1998)
 Tomorrow's Dream (1998), with Janette Oke
 The Book of Hours (2000)
 Kingdom Come (2001), with Larry Burkett
 Elixir (2004)
 Heartland (2006)
 My Soul to Keep (2007)
 Full Circle (2008)
 All Through the Night (2008)
 Book of Dreams (2012)
 Prayers of a Stranger (2012)
 Unlimited (2013)
 The Turning (2014)
 The Sign Painter (2014)
 The Patmos Deception (2014)
 The Pilgrim (2015)
 The Fragment (2016)
 The Domino Effect (2016)

As Thomas Locke 
 The Delta Factor (1994)
 The Omega Network (1995)
 To the Ends of the Earth: A Novel of the Byzantine Empire (1996)
 The Aqaba Exchange (1996)
 One False Move (1997)
 Enclave (2018)
 Fortune's Favor (2022), with Jyoti Guptara

The Spectrum Chronicles 

 Light Weaver (1994)
 Dream Voyager (1995)
 Path Finder (1995)
 Heart Chaser (1997)

Legends of the Realm 
 
 1. Emissary (2014)
 2. Merchant of Alyss (2016)
 The Captive (2014) [short story]
 3. The Golden Vial (2018)

Fault Lines 
 
 1. Fault Lines (2017)
 2. Trial Run (2015)
 3. Flash Point (2016)

Recruits 

 1. Recruits (2017)
 2. Renegades (2017)

References

External links
 Official website 

20th-century American novelists
Christian writers
Living people
1952 births
Novelists from North Carolina
American thriller writers
American historical novelists
21st-century American novelists
American male novelists
Place of birth missing (living people)
20th-century American male writers
21st-century American male writers